Craig D. Adams (born April 26, 1977) is a Bruneian-born Canadian former professional ice hockey player, who most recently played with the Pittsburgh Penguins of the National Hockey League. Adams was born in Seria, Brunei, but was raised in Calgary, Alberta, residing and playing hockey in the community of Lake Bonavista. Adams won the Stanley Cup with both the Carolina Hurricanes (in 2006) and the Pittsburgh Penguins (in 2009).

Playing career 
Adams was selected in the 9th round, 223rd overall, in the 1996 NHL Entry Draft by the Hartford Whalers where he gained the distinction of being their last draft pick. Adams was drafted after his freshman season at Harvard University. He suffered a season-ending shoulder injury on December 27, 1997 in a game against the University of Wisconsin–Madison.

Adams made his NHL debut in the 2000–01 season with the Hurricanes, who had relocated from Hartford, and had been a regular in the NHL since the 2002–03 season.

In the 2004-05 he signed for the Italian team Milano Vipers during the NHL lock-out. There he won the Italian League.

On August 25, 2005 he signed a contract with the Mighty Ducks of Anaheim, but was traded back to the Hurricanes on October 3, a few days before the 2005–06 NHL season began. Adams was a member of the Hurricanes 2006 Stanley Cup-winning team, becoming the first Bruneian-born player to have his name engraved on the trophy.

On January 17, 2008 Adams was traded to the Chicago Blackhawks for a conditional pick in the 2009 NHL Entry Draft.

During the 2008-09 season, Adams was claimed by the Pittsburgh Penguins off waivers from the Blackhawks on March 4, 2009. Adams found a role on the fourth line and would go on to win his second Stanley Cup championship. On June 29, 2009, Adams was re-signed by the Penguins to a two-year contract.

On June 9, 2011, Adams was re-signed by the Penguins to another two-year contract.

On July 5, 2013, Adams was re-signed again to a two-year contract. At the beginning of the 2013–14 season, on October 3, 2013, Adams scored the 50th goal of his career against Cory Schneider of the New Jersey Devils.

On April 29, 2015, after seven seasons within the organization, Adams was informed by the Pittsburgh Penguins that he would not be re-signed to another contract. On January 26, 2016, after a 14-year career, Adams announced his retirement.

Personal
Adams was the first NHL player to be born in Brunei. He was born in the country, as his father was an employee of Shell Oil at the time of his birth. The family settled in Calgary, Alberta shortly afterwards. He attended Strathcona Tweedsmuir School for high school.

Adams is married since 2003 to his wife Anne Cellucci, a daughter of the late Paul Cellucci, former Governor of Massachusetts and US Ambassador to Canada. They have three children.

Adams now works as a financial advisor for hockey players at Merrill Lynch in Boston. He has pledged his brain to research on the effects of CTE.

Career statistics

Regular season and playoffs

Awards and honours

Transactions
On June 22, 1996 the Hartford Whalers drafted Craig Adams in the ninth-round (#223 overall) of the 1996 NHL draft.
On July 31, 2001 the Carolina Hurricanes re-signed restricted free agent Craig Adams to a 2-year contract.
On May 1, 2003 the Carolina Hurricanes re-signed restricted free agent Craig Adams to a 1-year contract.
On July 28, 2004 the Milano Vipers (Italy) signed Craig Adams.
On August 25, 2005 the Mighty Ducks of Anaheim signed free agent Craig Adams to a 1-year contract.
On October 3, 2005 the Mighty Ducks of Anaheim traded Craig Adams to the Carolina Hurricanes in exchange for Bruno St. Jacques.
On June 30, 2006 the Carolina Hurricanes re-signed Craig Adams to a 3-year contract.
On January 17, 2008 the Carolina Hurricanes traded Craig Adams to the Chicago Blackhawks in exchange for a conditional 2009 ninth-round pick (Not exercised).
On March 4, 2009 the Pittsburgh Penguins claimed Craig Adams off of waivers from the Chicago Blackhawks.
On June 29, 2009 the Pittsburgh Penguins re-signed Craig Adams to a 2-year contract.
On June 9, 2011 the Pittsburgh Penguins re-signed Craig Adams to a 2-year/$1.35 million contract.
On July 5, 2013 Adams was re-signed by the Pittsburgh Penguins to a 2-year, $1.5 million contract.
On January 26, 2016, Adams announced his retirement from professional hockey at the age of 38, and after 14 seasons in the NHL.

References

External links

1977 births
Calgary Canucks players
Canadian ice hockey right wingers
Carolina Hurricanes players
Chicago Blackhawks players
Cincinnati Cyclones (IHL) players
Hartford Whalers draft picks
Harvard Crimson men's ice hockey players
HC Milano players
Living people
Lowell Lock Monsters players
Pittsburgh Penguins players
Ice hockey people from Calgary
Stanley Cup champions
Canadian expatriate ice hockey players in Italy
Canadian expatriate ice hockey players in the United States